White County is one of the 141 Cadastral divisions of New South Wales. It is located to the south of the Namoi River along both sides of Bohena Creek, with Narrabri at the northern end. It includes most of the Pilliga Nature Reserve.

White County was named in honour of the surveyor and diarist George Boyle White (1802-1876).

Parishes within this county
A full list of parishes found within this county; their current LGA and mapping coordinates to the approximate centre of each location is as follows:

References

Counties of New South Wales